Edward Christopher Sheeran  (born 17 February 1991) is an English singer-songwriter. Born in Halifax, West Yorkshire, and raised in Framlingham, Suffolk, he began writing songs around the age of eleven. In early 2011, Sheeran independently released the extended play No. 5 Collaborations Project. He signed with Asylum Records the same year.

Sheeran's debut album, + ("Plus"), was released in September 2011 and topped the UK Albums Chart. It contained his first hit single "The A Team". In 2012, Sheeran won the Brit Awards for Best British Male Solo Artist and British Breakthrough Act. Sheeran's second studio album, × ("Multiply"), topped charts around the world upon its release in June 2014. It was named the second-best-selling album worldwide of 2015. In the same year, × won Album of the Year at the 2015 Brit Awards, and he received the Ivor Novello Award for Songwriter of the Year from the British Academy of Songwriters, Composers and Authors. A single from ×, "Thinking Out Loud", earned him the 2016 Grammy Awards for Song of the Year and Best Pop Solo Performance.

Sheeran's third album, ÷ ("Divide"), was released in March 2017, and was the best-selling album worldwide of 2017. The first two singles from the album, "Shape of You" and "Castle on the Hill", broke records in a number of countries by debuting in the top two positions of the charts. He also became the first artist to have two songs debut in the US top 10 in the same week. By March 2017, Sheeran had accumulated ten top 10 singles from ÷ on the UK Singles Chart, breaking the record for most top 10 UK singles from one album. His fourth single from ÷, "Perfect", reached number one in the US, Australia and the UK, where it became the Christmas number one in 2017. The world's best-selling artist of 2017, he was named the Global Recording Artist of the Year. Released in 2019, his first collaborative album, No.6 Collaborations Project, debuted at number one in most major markets, and spawned three UK number one singles, "I Don't Care", "Beautiful People" and "Take Me Back to London". His fourth studio album, = ("Equals"), topped the charts in most major markets in 2021.

Sheeran has sold more than 150 million records worldwide, making him one of the world's best-selling music artists. He has 101 million RIAA-certified units in the US, and two of his albums are in the list of the best-selling albums in UK chart history. In December 2019, the Official Charts Company named him artist of the decade, with the most combined success in the UK album and singles charts in the 2010s. Globally, Spotify named him the second most streamed artist of the decade. Beginning in March 2017, his ÷ Tour became the highest-grossing of all time in August 2019. An alumnus of the National Youth Theatre in London, Sheeran's acting roles include appearing in the 2019 film Yesterday.

Early life and education 

Edward Christopher Sheeran was born in Halifax, West Yorkshire, England on 17 February 1991. His early childhood home was on Birchcliffe Road in nearby Hebden Bridge. His father was a curator at Cartwright Hall in Bradford and his mother worked at Manchester City Art Gallery. In December 1995 he moved with his family from Hebden Bridge to Framlingham in Suffolk, where he attended the independent Brandeston Hall preparatory school (now Framlingham College Prep School), then Thomas Mills High School, also in Framlingham. He has an older brother named Matthew, who works as a composer. Sheeran's parents, John and Imogen, are from London. His paternal grandparents are Irish, and Sheeran has stated that his father is from a "very large" Catholic family. John is an art curator and lecturer, and Imogen is a culture publicist turned jewellery designer. His parents ran Sheeran Lock, an independent art consultancy, from 1990 to 2010.

Sheeran sang at a local church choir at the age of four, learned how to play the guitar at age eleven, and began writing songs while at Thomas Mills High School in Framlingham. He also played the cello when he was younger. A 2004 school report described him as a "natural performer", and his classmates also voted him "most likely to be famous". He was accepted at the National Youth Theatre in London as a teenager. He successfully auditioned for Youth Music Theatre UK in 2007 and joined their production of Frankenstein – A New Musical in Plymouth. He is a patron of Youth Music Theatre UK (now renamed British Youth Music Theatre) and of Access to Music, where he studied Artist Development. Sheeran is a second cousin of Northern Irish broadcaster Gordon Burns, who hosted the British game show The Krypton Factor.

Career

2004–2010: Career beginnings

Sheeran began recording music in 2004, and at the age of thirteen independently released his first collection of work, titled Spinning Man. He has been friends with fellow English singer Passenger since he was 15, with the two playing the same gig in Cambridge. He moved to London in 2008 and began playing in small venues. In 2008, he auditioned for the ITV series Britannia High. He also opened for Nizlopi in Norwich in April 2008, after being one of their guitar technicians. In the autumn of 2009, Sheeran began studying music at the Academy of Contemporary Music (ACM) in Guildford, Surrey as an undergraduate at the age 18, but left without permission in the same year to support hip-hop artist Just Jack.
He released another EP in 2009, You Need Me, and also collaborated several times with Essex singer Leddra Chapman, including CeeLo Green's "Fuck You". In February 2010, Sheeran posted a video through SB.TV – a channel launched by British entrepreneur Jamal Edwards – and rapper Example invited Sheeran to tour with him. In the same month, he also released his critically acclaimed Loose Change EP, which featured his future debut single, "The A Team".

Sheeran began to be seen by more people over the internet through YouTube and his fan base expanded, with him also receiving praise from The Independent newspaper and Elton John. He played a Station Session in St. Pancras International in June 2010. Some of the episode is on their Facebook page Sheeran also self-released two other EPs in 2010, Ed Sheeran: Live at the Bedford and Songs I Wrote with Amy, which is a collection of love songs he wrote in Wales with Amy Wadge. When in Los Angeles in 2010, he was invited to perform at The Foxxhole, a club run by actor Jamie Foxx, which ended with an invitation to stay at Foxx's home.

On 8 January 2011, Sheeran released another independent EP, No. 5 Collaborations Project, featuring grime artists such as Wiley, Jme, Devlin, Sway and Ghetts. With this EP, Sheeran gained mainstream attention for having reached number 2 in the iTunes chart without any promotion or label, selling over 7,000 copies in the first week. Three months later, Sheeran put on a free show to fans at the Barfly in Camden Town. Over 1,000 fans turned up, so Sheeran played four different shows to ensure everyone saw a gig, including a gig outside on the street after the venue had closed. Later that month, Sheeran was signed to Asylum Records.

2011–2013: Debut studio album, + ("Plus")
On 26 April 2011, Sheeran appeared on the BBC music show Later... with Jools Holland, where he performed his debut single "The A Team". Six weeks later, "The A Team" was released as a digital download in the UK. The release served as the lead single from Sheeran's debut studio album, + ("Plus"). "The A Team" entered the UK Singles Chart at number three, selling over 58,000 copies in the first week. It was the best-selling debut single and the overall eighth-best selling single of 2011, selling 801,000 copies. The lead single also became a top ten hit in Australia, Germany, Ireland, Japan, Luxembourg, New Zealand, Norway and the Netherlands. During a headline set in the BBC Introducing tent at Glastonbury Festival 2011, Sheeran announced that "You Need Me, I Don't Need You" would be released on 26 August as the second single from the album. The second single peaked at number four on the UK Singles Chart. "Lego House" was released as the third single, reaching the top ten on the Australian, Irish and New Zealand Singles Charts. The music video for "Lego House" features actor Rupert Grint, as a play on their similar appearance. "Drunk", released on 19 February 2012, became Sheeran's fourth consecutive top ten single in the UK, peaking at number nine.

Sheeran released + on 12 September 2011. The album received generally favourable reviews from music critics and debuted at number one on the UK Albums Chart for sales of 102,000 copies. By end of 2011, sales of the album in the UK stand at 791,000; it became the second best-selling debut album and the ninth biggest-selling album there. The album has been certified platinum six times by the British Phonographic Industry, denoting shipments of 1,800,000 copies. As of March 2012, the album had sold 1,021,072 copies in the UK. The album also reached the top five in Australia, Canada, Ireland, New Zealand and the US.

The song, "Moments", on the debut album by boy band One Direction, released in November 2011, was co-written by Sheeran. At the 2012 Brit Awards on 21 February, Sheeran won the Brit Awards for Best British Male Solo Artist, and British Breakthrough Act of the Year. On 10 January 2012, it was announced that Sheeran would support Snow Patrol on their US tour from late March until May. His song, "Give Me Love", was featured in the episode "Dangerous Liaisons" of The Vampire Diaries. At the Ivor Novello Awards in May 2012, Sheeran's "The A Team" bested Adele's "Rolling in the Deep" and Florence and the Machine's "Shake It Out" for Best Song Musically and Lyrically. Sheeran performed "The A Team" at the Diamond Jubilee of Queen Elizabeth II concert held on The Mall outside Buckingham Palace on 4 June 2012 and a cover of Pink Floyd's "Wish You Were Here" at the closing ceremony of the 2012 Summer Olympics in London on 12 August 2012.

Taylor Swift contacted Sheeran after hearing his music while touring Australia in March 2012. He later co-wrote and provided vocals for "Everything Has Changed", a single featured on Swift's fourth studio album, Red. Sheeran also contributed two songs to One Direction's second studio album, Take Me Home, released in November 2012; the single "Little Things" became the group's second number-one in the UK. Sheeran's album peaked at No. 5 on the Billboard 200, while "The A Team" reached No. 16 on the US Billboard Hot 100. In late 2012 and early 2013, he headlined a US tour of 6,000–9,000 capacity venues. "The A Team" received a nomination for Song of the Year at the 2013 Grammy Awards. Elton John, who runs Sheeran's management company, canvassed the award organisers to get Sheeran a performance slot at the ceremony but was told that Sheeran alone was not high-profile enough. John decided to appear with Sheeran to circumvent this problem. Sheeran was also featured on some tracks from Irish singer Foy Vance's fourth album Joy of Nothing.

From March to September 2013, Sheeran played at arenas and stadiums across North America as the opening act for Swift's The Red Tour. According to Sheeran, it was then his biggest tour, and he added a scarlet RED tattoo to commemorate it. In October 2013, Sheeran headlined three sold-out shows at New York's Madison Square Garden. At the concert, Sheeran debuted new songs, including "Tenerife Sea", a future track on his second studio album. Sheeran released "I See Fire" on 5 November 2013. The song is featured in the end credits of the film The Hobbit: The Desolation of Smaug, the film's soundtrack, and on the deluxe version of his second album. Sheeran was nominated for Best New Artist at the 2014 Grammy Awards.

2014–2015: Second studio album, × ("Multiply")

On 24 March 2014, Sheeran performed at the Teenage Cancer Trust charity concert at the Royal Albert Hall in London where he unveiled "Take It Back", a track that would appear on the deluxe version of the second album. "Sing", the lead single, was released on 7 April 2014. Sonically, the song is a departure from Sheeran's previous recordings. "Sing" was intended to create hype over the album release, but from concern that this might alienate Sheeran's fan base, "One", an acoustic ballad, was released on 16 May 2014; "One" also marked the first of several promotional singles released leading to the album release. By early June 2014, "Sing" had earned Sheeran his first number-one single in the UK.

Sheeran's second studio album, × ("Multiply"), was released worldwide on 23 June 2014. Spanning three years, Sheeran wrote more than 120 songs for the album. The album features tracks produced by Rick Rubin, Pharrell Williams and Benny Blanco, as well as that of Gosling's. × peaked at number one in both the UK Albums Chart and the US Billboard 200. To support the album, Sheeran embarked on a world tour starting on 6 August 2014 at Osaka, Japan. On 27 September 2014, Sheeran was one of the headline acts at the Melbourne Cricket Ground prior to the 2014 AFL Grand Final.
Following "Don't", "Thinking Out Loud" was released on 24 September 2014 as the album's third single. Unlike his previous music videos, Sheeran took the lead role in the single's accompaniment, where he performed a ballroom dance. It became his second single to reach number one in the UK, and it also spent eight weeks at number two on the US Billboard Hot 100 (with only "Uptown Funk" by Mark Ronson featuring Bruno Mars keeping it from top spot). In 2014, combined streams on Sheeran's catalogue in Spotify reached 860 million; Spotify named him the most-streamed artist and × the most-streamed album. In the same year, the album made Sheeran iTunes' best-selling artist in the UK, Ireland and New Zealand.

× was nominated for Album of the Year at the 57th Grammy Awards. Sheeran performed "Thinking Out Loud" alongside John Mayer, Questlove and Herbie Hancock at the ceremony. On 25 February, Sheeran won British Male Solo Artist and British Album of the Year for × at the 2015 Brit Awards. On 21 May he received the Ivor Novello Award for Songwriter of the Year. On 21 June, Sheeran co-hosted the 2015 Much Music Video Awards in Toronto, where he performed the singles, "Thinking Out Loud" and "Photograph"; he also won two awards, Best International Artist and Most Buzzworthy International Artist or Group. On 27 June, Sheeran performed as the opening act for The Rolling Stones in their Zip Code Tour date in Kansas City's Arrowhead Stadium. On 10–12 July 2015, Sheeran performed sold-out shows at London's Wembley Stadium. The shows, which were announced in November 2014, were part of his world tour. The concert was documented and aired on 16 August 2015 on NBC; the one-hour special Ed Sheeran – Live at Wembley Stadium also included behind-the-scenes footage. In November 2015 Sheeran released the DVD Jumpers for Goalposts: Live at Wembley Stadium; the title is a nod to playing concerts at Wembley Stadium, the home of English football.

In 2015, Sheeran wrote "Love Yourself" for Justin Bieber's fourth album. Sheeran had initially planned to put the song on his third album ÷ and added that the track would have been scrapped before Bieber took the song. In August 2015, he sang along with Macklemore on the track "Growing Up". On 26 September, Sheeran performed at the 2015 Global Citizen Festival in Central Park's Great Lawn in New York, an event organised by Coldplay lead singer, Chris Martin, that advocates an end to extreme global poverty. Sheeran headlined the festival along with Beyoncé, Coldplay, and Pearl Jam. The festival was broadcast on NBC in the US on 27 September and the BBC in the UK on 28 September. Sheeran co-hosted the 2015 MTV Europe Music Awards on 25 October in Milan, Italy. He won the awards for Best Live Act and Best Live Stage; the latter was in recognition for his performance at the 2014 V Festival in England. Sheeran won the Breakthrough award at the 2015 Billboard Touring Awards. His single from ×, "Thinking Out Loud", earned him two Grammy Awards at the 2016 ceremony: Song of the Year and Best Pop Solo Performance. In May 2016, × was named the second-best-selling album worldwide in 2015, behind 25 by Adele.

2016–2018: Third studio album, ÷ ("Divide"), highest grossing tour of all time

On 13 December 2016, after a year long hiatus and social media break, Sheeran tweeted a picture and changed his Twitter, Facebook and Instagram to a light blue, implying the release of a new album – each of Sheeran's previous albums were a single-coloured background with a solid mathematical symbol. On 2 January, he posted a 10-second video on Twitter and other social media platforms, revealing the tracklist and cover art of his fourth studio album, ÷ ("Divide"), which was released on 3 March 2017. The album debuted at number one in the UK, the US, Germany, Australia, Canada and other major markets. With first week sales of 672,000 it is the fastest selling album by a male solo artist in the UK, and third fastest in UK chart history behind 25 by Adele and Be Here Now by Oasis. It had the biggest first week sales of 2017 in the US, until it was surpassed by Taylor Swift's Reputation.

On 6 January, Sheeran released two singles, "Shape of You" and "Castle on the Hill"; the theme of the latter single Sheeran's upbringing in his home town of Framlingham in Suffolk, with the castle referring to Framlingham Castle. Following the release of these singles, Sheeran co-hosted the BBC Radio 1 Breakfast Show with Scott Mills where it was implied that he would possibly make an appearance at the Glastonbury Festival in 2017. It was also during this show that Sheeran used a new Martin guitar that featured the ÷ logo (of his new album) on both the headstock and body of the acoustic guitar. Both singles went on to break the Spotify day one streaming record, with a combined total of over 13 million streams in 24 hours.

On 13 January, "Shape of You" and "Castle on the Hill" entered the UK Singles Chart at number one and number two, the first time in history an artist has taken the top two UK chart positions with new songs. The same day he also became the first artist to debut at number one and number two on the German Single Charts. On 15 January, the songs debuted at number one and number two on the ARIA Singles Chart, the first time this has been achieved in the history of the Australian chart. On 17 January, "Shape of You" debuted at number one on the US Billboard Hot 100, while "Castle on the Hill" entered at number six; this made Sheeran the first artist ever to have two songs simultaneously debut in the US top 10. The team behind TLC's song "No Scrubs" were given writing credits on "Shape of You" after fans and critics found similarities between elements of the two songs.

On 26 January, Sheeran announced dates for the beginning of the Divide Tour with shows in Europe, South America and North America from 17 March until 14 June 2017. On 17 February, Sheeran released "How Would You Feel (Paean)". Though not an official single, the song peaked at number two in the UK. By 11 March 2017 Sheeran had accumulated ten top 10 singles from ÷ on the UK Singles Chart, breaking Scottish DJ Calvin Harris's record of nine top 10 singles from one album. On 25 June, Sheeran headlined the final night of Glastonbury, performing in front of 135,000 people. At the 2017 MTV Video Music Awards Sheeran was named Artist of the Year. The fourth single from ÷, "Perfect", reached number one in the UK and Australia, and a stripped-down acoustic version of the song titled "Perfect Duet", a collaboration with Beyoncé, reached number one in the US and the UK, becoming the year's UK Christmas number one. On 7 November, Taylor Swift revealed that Sheeran collaborated on the song "End Game" for her sixth studio album Reputation. The song, which also features rapper Future, was released on 10 November.

On 4 December, Sheeran was named Spotify's most streamed artist of 2017 with 6.3 billion streams. He has Spotify's biggest album of the year with ÷ streamed 3.1 billion times, and the top song with "Shape of You" with 1.4 billion streams. On 5 December 2017, hip-hop artist Eminem announced that Sheeran had collaborated on the song "River" for his ninth studio album Revival. On working with Eminem, Sheeran stated, "He is one of the reasons I started writing songs, and was such a pleasure to work with him." In December 2017, Sheeran appeared on BBC Radio 1's Live Lounge, performing his song "Perfect" and a duet of The Pogues' festive classic "Fairytale of New York" with Anne-Marie. 

On 3 January 2018, "Shape of You" was named the best selling single of 2017 in the UK, and the best selling single of 2017 on the Billboard Hot 100 in the US. The same day, ÷ was named the best selling album of 2017 in the UK, and the US. As the best-selling artist worldwide for 2017 the International Federation of the Phonographic Industry (IFPI) named him the Global Recording Artist of the Year. At the 2018 Brit Awards held at the O2 Arena in London on 21 February, Sheeran performed "Supermarket Flowers", and received the Global Success Award from Elton John and Rolling Stones guitarist Ronnie Wood. Sheeran played to over 950,000 people in Australia and New Zealand in March and April, making it the biggest concert tour in Australasian music history, overtaking the previous record set by Dire Straits in 1986. In April, the IFPI named ÷ the best-selling album worldwide of 2017. At the 2018 Billboard Music Awards on 20 May, Sheeran performed "Galway Girl" from Phoenix Park in Dublin, Ireland, and picked up six awards, including Top Artist and Top Hot 100 Artist. In 2018 Sheeran wrote songs for boy bands. "Trust Fund Baby", by Why Don't We, was released on 1 February 2018, and "Summer On You", by PrettyMuch, was released on 21 June 2018.

2019–2022: No.6 Collaborations Project, fourth studio album, = ("Equals")
On 10 May 2019, Sheeran released the single "I Don't Care", a duet with Justin Bieber, from his fourth studio album No.6 Collaborations Project. On Spotify, "I Don't Care" debuted with 10.977 million daily global streams, breaking the platform's single-day streaming record. The song debuted at number one in the UK, Australia and other markets, and number two in the US. On 31 May, "Cross Me" featuring Chance the Rapper and PnB Rock, debuted at number 9 in the UK. Released on 28 June 2019, "Beautiful People" featuring Khalid debuted at number 3 in the UK and number 4 in Australia. On 5 July, Sheeran released two new songs, "Best Part of Me" featuring Yebba, and "Blow" with Bruno Mars and Chris Stapleton. On 12 July, he released the album, along with "Antisocial" with Travis Scott. The album debuted at number one in the UK, the US, Australia and other markets. As of 9 August 2019, his four albums have spent a combined 41 weeks at number one in the UK, the most weeks at number one in the UK Album Charts in the 2010s, five weeks more than Adele in second. On 26 August, Sheeran wrapped up the 260-show Divide Tour with the last of four homecoming gigs in Ipswich, Suffolk; the tour included, for example, his performance for over 100,000 people at Malmi Airport in Helsinki, Finland on 24 July. On 30 August, the seventh single from the album, "Take Me Back to London" featuring Stormzy, reached number one in the UK.

In 2019, Sheeran co-wrote country music singer Kenny Chesney's single "Tip of My Tongue". In December 2019, Sheeran was named artist of the decade by the Official Charts Company for being the most successful performer in the UK album and singles charts of the 2010s. Eight of his songs featured in the Official Chart Company's chart of the decade with three songs inside the top 5 – "Shape of You" was named number one. Globally, Spotify named him the second most streamed artist of the decade behind Drake. On 21 December 2020, after being on hiatus after having his first child with Cherry Seaborn in August, he released the surprise single, "Afterglow".

On 25 June 2021, Sheeran released "Bad Habits", the lead single from his upcoming fifth studio album. His 10th UK number one single, the song spent eleven consecutive weeks at the top of the UK Singles Chart and Irish Singles Chart, topped the charts in Australia, Canada and Germany among others, and peaked at number two on the Billboard Hot 100 in the US. His eleventh week at number one in the UK saw him become the first British solo artist to notch up 52 weeks at Number 1 across his catalogue, with only Elvis Presley (80 weeks) and The Beatles (69 weeks) achieving more weeks at the summit. On 19 August, Sheeran announced that his fourth studio album, = ("Equals"), will be released on 29 October 2021. The cover was painted by him during the first COVID-19 lockdown, and is based on the changes his life had during the last four years, including marriage, having a child and losing friends. The promotional single "Visiting Hours" was released alongside the announcement. On 9 September, he was part of the 2021 Kickoff Experience ahead of the American NFL season opening game. Released on 10 September, "Shivers" dethroned "Bad Habits" at the top of the UK and Irish singles charts. Topping the charts in most major markets, = became his fifth UK number one album, and fourth US number one.

On 29 November 2021, Sheeran and Elton John released "Merry Christmas", a duet single for charity. Inspired by a scene from the 2003 romantic-comedy film Love Actually, the song's music video sees the duo pay homage to scenes from past British Christmas hits, including "Last Christmas", "Walking in the Air", "Merry Christmas Everyone", and "Stay Another Day". All of the UK profits from the song went to the Ed Sheeran Suffolk Music Foundation and the Elton John AIDS Foundation. Debuting at number one in the UK Singles Chart on 10 December, it was Sheeran's 12th chart-topper. On 23 December, Sheeran featured on the remix of Fireboy DML's song "Peru".

On 11 February 2022, Sheeran released a duet version of "The Joker and the Queen" featuring Taylor Swift. On 4 March, he featured in "Bam Bam", collaborating for the second time with Camila Cabello. Later that month he collaborated with Colombian singer J Balvin in the singles "Sigue" and "Forever My Love". Sheeran commenced his +–=÷x Tour (Mathematics Tour) on 21 March. He played warm-up shows at the Electric Ballroom in Camden Town, London before the main tour began with two concerts at Croke Park in Dublin. On 22 April, Sheeran released the fifth single from =, "2step" featuring Lil Baby, before releasing a version of the song featuring Ukrainian pop-rock band Antytila. 2022 also saw Sheeran venture into heavier styles of music, releasing a new version of "Bad Habits" with the pop metal group Bring Me the Horizon in February. Later that year it was reported that he was in contact with Suffolk extreme metal group Cradle of Filth over a possible project, with frontman Dani Filth confirming progress on the collaboration in August. 

On 29 September, Sheeran released the single "Celestial", a collaboration with Japanese media franchise Pokemon. On November, "Shivers" became Sheeran's 11th song to reach 1 billion streams on Spotify. He celebrated via an Instagram post, saying that he was currently filming a music video for his next album, scheduled to be released the following year. Sheeran was spotted at a beach in the coastal Suffolk town of Lowestoft.

2023-present: Fifth studio album, – ("Subtract")
On 1 March 2023, Sheeran officially announced on all social media platforms that his fifth studio album, − ("Subtract"), will be released on 5 May 2023.

Musical style and influences

Ed Sheeran's musical style has been described as pop, folk-pop, and soft rock. Sheeran also incorporates rap into his music. Sheeran's earliest memories include listening to the records of Joni Mitchell, Bob Dylan and Elton John's Greatest Hits. According to Sheeran, the album that introduced him to music was Van Morrison's Irish Heartbeat. During his childhood his father took him to live concerts that would inspire his musical creations. These included seeing Eric Clapton at the Royal Albert Hall, Paul McCartney in Birmingham, and Bob Dylan. On the influence of Clapton, Sheeran states, "He's the reason I started playing guitar". He singled out Clapton's performance at the Party at the Palace in the grounds of Buckingham Palace, "I was eleven when I saw Eric Clapton play at the Queen's Golden Jubilee concert in June 2002. I remember him walking on stage with this rainbow-coloured Stratocaster and playing the first riff of 'Layla'. I was hooked. Two days later I bought a black Stratocaster copy for £30 that came with an amp. All I did for the next month was try to play that 'Layla' riff."

Sheeran has also cited the Beatles, Nizlopi and Eminem as his biggest musical influences. He is also a fan of heavier music and cites bands such as Cradle of Filth, Slipknot, Korn, Marilyn Manson and Bring Me the Horizon as other influences. As a teenager, he also had a Kerrang! subscription. According to Sheeran, he had a stutter in his speech when he was younger, and he credited rapping along to Eminem's The Marshall Mathers LP for helping him stammer less. He was also inspired by "Cannonball" singer-songwriter Damien Rice in 2002, with Sheeran stating, "seeing him play this small club in Ireland, I was able to meet him, and he was unbelievably cool. I went straight home and started writing songs. I would not be doing what I'm doing now if he'd been a jerk." He also played the guitar to Westlife's Greatest Hits album when he was ten, citing them as one of his influences. Sheeran collaborated with his idol Eric Clapton in April 2016, with Sheeran stating to People magazine, "I sang on Eric Clapton's album I Still Do. It's one thing having him on mine, but being on his, that's an honour that you can't ever pinpoint on how great that is. I did something for his record, and I was credited as 'Angelo Mysterioso', appearing as a guest on Clapton's 'I Will Be There', in addition to performing the song with Clapton on stage, and he did something for my record performing a guitar solo on 'Dive' on Sheeran's album ÷ and was credited as 'Angelo Mysterioso'." Sheeran also cited Taylor Swift as one of his influences, suggesting in 2015 their respective success drives each other on.

Other ventures

Gingerbread Man Records

In March 2015, Sheeran announced he was setting up a record label, Gingerbread Man Records, which is a deal with Warner Music Group. The label was launched in August 2015 alongside its accompanying YouTube channel. Jamie Lawson, the label's first signee, met Sheeran while they were both in London's folk circuit. Lawson released his self-titled debut album on 9 October 2015, which has earned him a number one in the UK Albums Chart. Sheeran signed his second artist, Foy Vance, in November 2015. Maisie Peters also signed with the label in 2021.

Bertie Blossoms
On 29 September 2019, Sheeran announced he was teaming up with his manager Stuart Camp to open a bar located on Portobello Road in Notting Hill. The bar is called "Bertie Blossoms", and named after his wife Cherry Seaborn.

Charity work
Sheeran performed a gig in Bristol, which raised £40,000 for a charity that reaches out to street sex workers. "It's good to show insight that these people are real people with real emotions and they deserve the same charity work as anyone else," Sheeran said. "There's a lot more popular charities that get a lot of attention. And with certain subjects like this they're often washed over and people don't necessarily give them the attention they deserve." Tickets were available to those taking part in the charity's Give it up for One25 campaign by giving something up for 125 hours and hitting the £40,000 fundraising mark.

Sheeran frequently gives away his clothes to charity shops around Suffolk, his home county. An ambassador for East Anglia's Children's Hospice, he has donated clothes to the St Elizabeth Hospice charity shop in his home town Framlingham, including eight bags of clothes to the shop in February 2014. In 2016 he donated 13 bags of clothes to the shop. The tartan shirt worn by Sheeran when he met Renee Zellweger's character, Bridget, in Bridget Jones's Baby, was auctioned online to raise further funds for the hospice.

On 15 November 2014, Sheeran joined the charity supergroup Band Aid 30 along with other British and Irish pop acts, recording the latest version of the track "Do They Know It's Christmas?" at Sarm West Studios in Notting Hill, London, to raise money for the West African Ebola virus epidemic.

In November 2015, Sheeran supported the No Cold Homes campaign by the UK charity, Turn2us. Sheeran was one of nearly thirty celebrities, which included Helen Mirren, Jeremy Irons and Hugh Laurie, to donate items of winter clothing to the campaign, with the proceeds used to help people in the country struggling to keep their home warm in winter.

Sheeran teamed up with the cast of the BBC3 mockumentary sitcom People Just Do Nothing to perform a charity single for the BBC's biennial telethon Comic Relief which aired in March 2017. He appeared in a November 2017 episode of Gogglebox along with other UK celebrities such as Ozzy Osbourne, former Oasis frontman Liam Gallagher, and Labour Party leader Jeremy Corbyn as part of Channel 4 and Cancer Research UK's Stand Up to Cancer fundraising campaign.

In December 2019, he launched his own music foundation, Ed Sheeran Suffolk Music Foundation (ESSMF). In the statement, Sheeran stated it will help artists aged under 18 with "small but hopefully useful grants". In May 2020, Sheeran donated £170,000 to his former school Thomas Mills High School in Framlingham, Suffolk. The donations, which have been made over a two-year period via the Ed Sheeran Suffolk Music Foundation, helped the school to purchase items such as MacBooks, cameras and a photography darkroom. The same month, Sheeran made a donation to Ipswich Hospital. In June 2020, Sheeran made a "founding gift" to launch Suffolk Community Foundation's "Rebuilding Local Lives Appeal" in response to the COVID-19 pandemic on the celebration day of the county, "Suffolk Day". Sheeran has donated over £1 million to local charities in Suffolk amid the COVID-19 pandemic, including to a children's hospital ward.

Sheeran's parents organised The Ed Sheeran Made in Suffolk Legacy Auction on 23 October 2020 which ran until 8 November. The auction had 220 lots, including items donated by other celebrities such as David Beckham, Kylie Minogue and Usain Bolt. Sheeran has donated some of his personal items including handwritten lyrics from his song "Perfect", lego bricks he played with as a kid, handmade You Need Me EP from 2009 and a £3 ticket to his first gig at the British Legion in Framlingham. The auction was made to raise money for Suffolk charities such as GeeWizz and Zest who both support children and young adults in the county, including redeveloping a playground for kids with special educational needs and disabilities in Ipswich. In November Sheeran sold one of his paintings, marking the first and only time his art has been made available for sale, which he titled "Dab 2 2020", to the same auction. Later that month, Sheeran backed footballer Marcus Rashford's free school meals campaign and opened his own breakfast club at his Notting Hill restaurant, Bertie Blossoms. He announced on his Instagram that he provided hot breakfasts for "anyone who is normally entitled to a free school meal or who is struggling in these strange times". Sheeran's charity, the Framlingham Foundation Trust, is reported to have donated money to give a primary school teacher to take an imperative course to help children create songs with untraditional instruments which will benefit children with learning difficulties.

Acting

Sheeran made his acting debut in 2014, a cameo role as himself on New Zealand soap opera Shortland Street, filmed while he was in the country for a one-off performance. In May 2015, he appeared as himself and performed on a live episode of the NBC sitcom Undateable. Later that year, while in Australia, he recorded scenes for the soap Home and Away, as a character based on himself.

After recording a cover version of Foy Vance's "Make It Rain" for Sons of Anarchy, Sheeran was cast by creator Kurt Sutter to play Sir Cormac in the medieval drama The Bastard Executioner on FX. Sheeran also appeared as himself in the 2016 film Bridget Jones's Baby in a scene where Bridget Jones, played by Renée Zellweger, encounters the singer at the Glastonbury Festival.

In July 2017, Sheeran appeared in a scene on Game of Thrones opposite Maisie Williams, who plays Arya Stark. David Benioff explained that since Williams was a big fan of the singer, they wanted to have Sheeran appear on the show to surprise Williams, and that they had tried to get him on for years. It received a mix of positive and very negative reviews.

In June 2019, Sheeran made his debut appearance in an advertisement for Heinz Tomato Ketchup. A lifelong fan of the product — he has it with everything from fish and chips to his morning sausage "butty" to upmarket dinners, carries a bottle on tour, and has a Heinz Ketchup tattoo on his arm — he put forward an idea he had written for their next TV campaign, and the company responded. A representative from Heinz started that "1/3 of @HEINZ Instagram posts include people mentioning or tagging Ed, dating all the way back to 2014." Poking fun at people who turn their nose up at those who ask for ketchup in fancy restaurants, the advert sees him walking into a "super posh" restaurant while narrating the message he had sent to the company. As the other wealthy diners look on in horror at the sight of a ketchup bottle, he flips the bottle, bangs it against his hand to budge the ketchup and smothers it all over his food. The company released a limited edition ketchup product known as Ed Sheeran X Heinz ketchup, also known as "Heinz Edchup".

Released in June 2019, Sheeran appeared as himself in a supporting role in the Richard Curtis/Danny Boyle film Yesterday, a film about a struggling singer-songwriter who wakes up to find that no one but he remembers the Beatles.

Impact

Music journalist Alexis Petridis has stated that Ed Sheeran "brought pop back down to earth" with his music style, introducing himself "touting an even more austere version of Coldplay's dressed-down authenticity: one unassuming man, his guitar and a loop pedal". Noting him as "one of the most influential" artists of his generation, as he spawned "endless imitators", Petridis remarked that the music charts were "packed with Sheeran-alikes" after ×, describing it as "the wave of earnest, dressed-down, boy-next-door troubadours" that reached critical mass. Similarly, The Guardian writer Laura Snapes cited him as "the godfather of the current crop of singer-songwriters" in 2019, stating that Sheeran inspired "troubadours" to enter the music charts, and marked "the calcification of the everyman male pop star", and the end of record labels marketing them "exclusively to teenage girls and their mums." Billboard writer Jason Lipshutz noticed that his appeal and performance style had influenced up-and-coming soloists, impacting "a significant number of pop artists who crave his type of singular success." The Financial Times considered that the scale of Sheeran's commercial accomplishments has "broken through to such a wide and lucrative extent, far beyond the achievements of any of the other singer-songwriters in the market" in the UK.

iHeartMedia senior executive Sharon Dastur declared that Sheeran's success has allowed newer artists to be given an opportunity in the mainstream scene with quieter material at the forefront, instead of dance music. GQs George Chesterton deemed Sheeran "the de facto voice of a generation" as a consequence of his music reflecting his personality and "the defining characteristics of his audience", with such recurring qualities of his discography corresponding "with those that his own generation, the millennials, most value: authenticity, realness, earnestness, sincerity." BBC Radio 1 executive George Ergatoudis has stated that his "lyrical candour" and his "professional hunger" resonated with younger listeners, giving him a "very clear edge" to breakthrough in a music industry that  is "saturated with singer-songwriters", while Sheeran's "niche combination" has made him able to perform at hip-hop, grime and underground events and "convince the urban crowd that he was authentic". According to Vox, Sheeran has reached "global pop culture ubiquity". In 2017, the BBC named him the second-best performing artist of the decade, after Adele, while in 2021, The Independent said he had "one of the biggest pop careers of this generation." Billboard, The Financial Express, Brandon Sun, and Arab News have cited him as a "British music icon". Sheeran and his work have influenced various recording artists, including Shawn Mendes, Louis Tomlinson, Camila Cabello, and Cody Simpson.

Accolades 

On 19 October 2015, Sheeran received an honorary degree from the University of Suffolk in Ipswich for his "outstanding contribution to music". Sheeran commented: "Suffolk is very much where I call home. Receiving this recognition is a real privilege." He was appointed Member of the Order of the British Empire (MBE) in the 2017 Birthday Honours for "services to music and charity". Sheeran received the award from Prince Charles at Buckingham Palace on 7 December 2017. In 2012, he was named a baron of Sealand.

In addition to having the highest-grossing concert tour and being one of the world's best-selling music artists with more than 150 million records sold, Sheeran has received a number of awards. As of 2019, he has received four Grammy Awards (including Song of the Year in 2016 for "Thinking Out Loud"), five Brit Awards (including British Male Solo Artist in 2015), and six Billboard Music Awards (including Top Artist in 2018). In 2015 and 2018, he received the Ivor Novello Award for Songwriter of the Year from the British Academy of Songwriters, Composers, and Authors.

Although he regards Suffolk as home having moved to the county as a young child, Sheeran was recognised by his county of birth in a 2018 poll when he was ranked the fourth greatest Yorkshireman ever behind Monty Python comedian Michael Palin, and actors Sean Bean and Patrick Stewart.

Personal life

In early 2011, after securing recording and publishing deals, Sheeran purchased and renovated a farm near Framlingham, Suffolk, where he was raised. He has stated that he hopes to raise a family there. During 2013, he lived between Hendersonville, Tennessee and Los Angeles, California. In 2014, he bought a house in South London.

Sheeran was in a relationship with Scottish singer-songwriter Nina Nesbitt (who was in his music video for "Drunk") in 2012, before breaking up. Nesbitt is the subject of Sheeran's songs "Nina" and "Photograph", while most of Nesbitt's album, Peroxide, is about Sheeran. In 2014, Sheeran was in a relationship with Athina Andrelos, who works for chef Jamie Oliver. She is the inspiration of Sheeran's song "Thinking Out Loud". They broke up in February 2015. He is also close friends with singer-songwriter Taylor Swift; the pair collaborated on her albums Red (original and re-recorded versions) and Reputation, as well as on a remix of the song "The Joker and the Queen" from Sheeran's album =.

In July 2015, Sheeran began a relationship with childhood friend and former secondary school classmate Cherry Seaborn. They announced their engagement in January 2018 and were married a year later. She is the inspiration of the song "Perfect". It was reported on 12 August 2020 that the couple were expecting their first child. On 1 September, Sheeran announced on Instagram that Seaborn had given birth to a baby girl the previous week. On 19 May 2022, it was announced that the couple's second child, a girl, was born.

Sheeran is a supporter of his local football club Ipswich Town, and his +–=÷x Tour kit sponsored their 2021–22 season. Additionally, Sheeran was named in the club's squad list and given the squad number of 17. His +–=÷x Tour kit sponsorship deal with Ipswich Town was renewed for the 2022–23 season. A collector of Panini's FIFA World Cup sticker album, he completed the 2014 World Cup album. Appearing as a guest on BBC Radio 4's Desert Island Discs on 7 May 2017, Sheeran chose His Dark Materials by Philip Pullman as his book of choice, and a lifetime supply of ketchup as the one inanimate luxury item that he would take with him on a desert island.

In June 2015, Forbes listed his earnings at $57 million for the previous 12 months, and ranked him the 27th-highest-earning celebrity in the world. In July 2018, Forbes named Sheeran 9th on their list of the highest paid celebrities. According to The Sunday Times Rich List of 2019, Sheeran is worth £160 million ($207 million) as the 17th richest musician in the UK. Sheeran's net worth is estimated at £200 million in 2020.

On 24 October 2021, Sheeran tested positive for COVID-19 less than a week before the release of his fifth album.

On 1 March 2023, he revealed that his wife, while pregnant, has developed a tumour with "no route to treatment until after the birth".

Legal issues
In 2017, Sheeran settled out of court over claims his song "Photograph" was a "note-for-note" copy of the chorus in the song "Amazing" by X Factor UK winner Matt Cardle. Sheeran later regretted the decision to settle, saying that it was done on the advice of his lawyers who thought the case was "more trouble than it was worth". He said he regretted settling the claim for "Photograph" not because of the money involved, but because it changed his relationship with the song. He said: "I didn't play 'Photograph' for ages after that. I just stopped playing it. I felt weird about it, it kind of made me feel dirty." He also thought that settling the case opened a floodgate of claims, including the "Shape of You" lawsuit.

In 2018, legal action was brought against Sheeran, Sony/ATV Music Publishing and Atlantic Records by the estate and heirs of the late producer Ed Townsend, who co-wrote the song "Let's Get It On" with Marvin Gaye. US District Judge Louis Stanton rejected Sheeran's call in 2019 for dismissal of a legal case accusing him of copying parts of the song in "Thinking Out Loud". Stanton said that a jury should decide but that he found "substantial similarities between several of the two works' musical elements". A previous case by Townsend's estate was dismissed without prejudice in February 2017.

Sheeran was taken to court in March 2022 for a copyright lawsuit over "Shape of You". Musicians Sami Chokri and Ross O'Donoghue alleged that the song infringed "particular lines and phrases" of their 2015 composition "Oh Why". Sheeran won the case, with Mr Justice Zacaroli ruling he "neither deliberately nor subconsciously" copied a phrase from Oh Why when writing Shape of You.

Political views
Sheeran publicly opposed Brexit (the United Kingdom leaving the European Union), and supported "remain". Following the June 2016 referendum result where the British public voted to leave, Sheeran was among a group of British musicians (which included Sting, Queen drummer Roger Taylor, Pink Floyd drummer Nick Mason and Damon Albarn of Blur and Gorillaz) who signed a letter to then Prime Minister Theresa May, drafted by Bob Geldof in October 2018, calling for "a 2nd vote". Stating that Brexit will "impact every aspect of the music industry. From touring to sales, to copyright legislation to royalty collation", the letter adds: "We dominate the market and our bands, singers, musicians, writers, producers and engineers work all over Europe and the world and in turn, Europe and the world come to us. Why? Because we are brilliant at it ... [Our music] reaches out, all inclusive, and embraces anyone and everyone. And that truly is what Britain is."

In 2017, Sheeran publicly endorsed the centre-left British Labour Party and described himself as a "fan" of its then-leader Jeremy Corbyn, while adding that "I'm not Mr Political. I vote the way I feel I should, but won't tell somebody else what to do."

In 2021, Sheeran, along with several other celebrities, urged the United States Congress to pass the proposed Equality Act, which would expand the Civil Rights Act in order to outlaw discrimination against LGBT people. Sheeran stated in the open letter that the Act is "essential to protect [...] the most marginalized communities."

In 2022, during the Russian invasion of Ukraine, Sheeran expressed support for Ukraine and participated in the Concert for Ukraine.

Discography

 + (2011)
 × (2014)
 ÷ (2017)
 = (2021)
 − (2023)

Filmography

Tours

Headlining act
 + Tour (2011–2013)
 × Tour (2014–2015)
 ÷ Tour (2017–2019)
 +–=÷× Tour (2022–2023)

Opening act
 Snow Patrol's Fallen Empires Tour (North American select dates) (2012)
 Taylor Swift's The Red Tour (all North American dates) (2013)
 The Rolling Stones's Zip Code Tour (Kansas City only)

See also
 List of Official Subscription Plays Chart number-one songs of the 2010s
 List of highest-grossing live music artists

Notes

References

Sources

External links

 
 
 

 
1991 births
Living people
Music YouTubers
British YouTubers
YouTubers from London
21st-century English male actors
21st-century English singers
Alumni of British Youth Music Theatre
Asylum Records artists
Atlantic Records artists
Brit Award winners
British folk-pop singers
British hip hop singers
British soft rock musicians
Elektra Records artists
English buskers
English male guitarists
English male singers
English male singer-songwriters
English people of Irish descent
English philanthropists
English pop guitarists
English pop singers
English record producers
Grammy Award winners
Ivor Novello Award winners
Male actors from Yorkshire
Members of the Order of the British Empire
MTV Europe Music Award winners
Musicians from Yorkshire
National Youth Theatre members
People from Framlingham
People from Halifax, West Yorkshire
People involved in plagiarism controversies